Pourouma petiolulata is a species of flowering plant in the genus Pourouma. It is endemic to Ecuador. Its natural habitat is subtropical or tropical moist lowland forests. It is threatened by habitat loss.

References

petiolulata
Endemic flora of Ecuador
Near threatened plants
Taxonomy articles created by Polbot